Coles Hill is an unincorporated community in Pittsylvania County, in the U.S. state of Virginia. It is the site of the largest uranium deposit in the U.S.; however a 1982 Virginia ban on uranium mining has kept its resources from being used commercially. The lode is the subject of an ongoing controversy about possible extraction. In October 2015, a federal judge will decide whether to lift the state ban. Lower courts ruled in favor of the state's ban, however in October 2018 the case was scheduled to be heard by the Supreme Court. The Supreme Court upheld Virginia's ban on uranium mining in Virginia Uranium, Inc. v. Warren.

References

Unincorporated communities in Virginia
Unincorporated communities in Pittsylvania County, Virginia